Hyperpop  is a loosely-defined music movement and microgenre that predominantly originated in the United Kingdom during the early-to-mid 2010s. It is characterized by a maximalist or exaggerated take on popular music, and artists within the genre typically integrate pop and avant-garde sensibilities while drawing on themes commonly found in electronic, hip hop, and dance music.

Deriving influence from a varied range of sources, some origins of the hyperpop scene are commonly traced to the output of English musician A. G. Cook's record label and collective PC Music and its associated artists such as Sophie and Charli XCX. Music associated with this scene received wider attention in August 2019 when Spotify used the term "hyperpop" as the name of a playlist featuring artists such as Cook and 100 Gecs. The genre spread within younger audiences through social media platforms, especially TikTok.

The movement is often linked to LGBTQ+ online communities, and many key figures identify as transgender, non-binary, or gay. "Digicore" and “Glitchcore” are contemporaneous movements that are sometimes conflated with "hyperpop" due to its overlapping artists.

Characteristics
Hyperpop reflects an exaggerated, eclectic, and self-referential approach to pop music and typically employs elements such as brash synth melodies, Auto-Tuned "earworm" vocals, and excessive compression and distortion, as well as surrealist or nostalgic references to 2000s Internet culture and the Web 2.0 era. Common features include vocals that are heavily processed; metallic, melodic percussion sounds; pitch-shifted synths; catchy choruses; short song lengths; and "shiny, cutesy aesthetics" juxtaposed with angst-ridden lyrics. The Wall Street Journals Mark Richardson described the genre as intensifying the "artificial" tropes of popular music, resulting in "a cartoonish wall of noise that embraces catchy tunes and memorable hooks. The music zooms between beauty and ugliness, as shimmery melodies collide with mangled instrumentation." Writing for American Songwriter, Joe Vitagliano described it as "an exciting, bombastic and iconoclastic genre — if it can even be called a 'genre'—[...] featuring "saw synths, auto-tuned vocals, glitch-inspired percussion and a distinctive late-capitalism-dystopia vibe." Artists often "straddle the avant-garde and the pop charts simultaneously."

According to Vice journalist Eli Enis, hyperpop is less rooted in musical technicalities than "a shared ethos of transcending genre altogether, while still operating within the context of pop." Artists in the style reflect a "tendency to rehabilitate styles of music that have long since gone out of fashion, constantly poking at what is or isn’t 'cool' or artful." The style may blend elements from a range of styles, including bubblegum pop, trance, Eurohouse, emo rap, nu metal, cloud rap, J-pop and K-pop. The influence of cloud rap, emo and lo-fi trap, trance music, dubstep, and chiptune are evident in hyperpop, as well as more surreal and haphazard qualities that are pulled heavily from hip hop since the mid-2010s. The Atlantic noted the way the genre "swirls together and speeds up Top 40 tricks of present and past: a Janet Jackson drum slam here, a Depeche Mode synth squeal there, the overblown pep of novelty jingles throughout," but also noted "the genre's zest for punk's brattiness, hip-hop's boastfulness, and metal's noise." Some of the style's more surreal and off kilter qualities drew from 2010s hip-hop.

Hyperpop is often linked to the LGBTQ+ community and queer aesthetics. Several of its key practitioners identify as non-binary, gay, or transgender, and the genre's emphasis on vocal modulation has allowed artists to experiment with the gender presentation of their voices.

Origins

The term "hyperpop" was coined on October 1988 by writer Don Shewey in an article about Scottish band Cocteau Twins, stating that England "in the ’80s it has nurtured the simultaneous phenomena of hyperpop and antipop". Shewey also noted that "fashion-conscious hype-meisters like Malcolm McLaren, Paul Morley (the rock journalist who invented Frankie Goes to Hollywood), and the Pet Shop Boys’ Neil Tennant—prime exponents of instantly obsolescent, escapist disco-pop—have turned pop’s star-making machinery back on itself, expending as much creative energy on manipulating the media as on making music.". The term "hyperpop" was sometimes used within SoundCloud's nightcore music scene as a genre descriptor . Spotify analyst Glenn McDonald stated that he first saw the term used in reference to the UK-based label PC Music in 2014, but believed that the name did not qualify as a microgenre until 2018. Despite many other artists and labels influencing the scene such as Meishi Smile and Maltine Records, the origins of the style are usually located to the mid-2010s output of PC Music, with hyperpop artists either being affiliated with or directly inspired by the label. The Independents Will Pritchard stated that "It's possible to see [hyperpop] as an expression not just of the genres it borrows from, but of the scene that evolved around A. G. Cook’s PC Music label (an early home to Sophie and Charli XCX, among others) in the UK in the early 2010s."

There were many other predecessors to the genre, as explained by Pritchard, "to some, the ground covered by hyperpop won’t seem all that new". He cited "outliers" of 2000s nu rave (such as Test Icicles) and PC Music contemporaries Rustie and Hudson Mohawke as pursuing similar approaches; of the latter two artists, he noted that their "fluoro, trance-edged smooshes of dance and hip-hop are reminiscent of a lot of hyperpop today."  Another artist who has heavily influenced the hyperpop scene is Yasutaka Nakata. A. G. Cook has personally cited Max Tundra, J Dilla and Kate Bush as major influences on the PC Music aesthetic. Heather Phares of AllMusic stated that the work of Sleigh Bells foreshadowed hyperpop and other artists who "brazenly ignored genre boundaries and united the extremes of sweet and heavy;" Ian Cohen of Pitchfork similarly stated that the term described Sleigh Bells before it became a dominant genre. Eilish Gilligan of Junkee credited Kesha for impacting the genre, stating that her "grating, half-spoken vocal featured in ['Blow'] and all of her early work, in fact, feel reminiscent of a lot of the intense vocals in hyperpop today", as well as Britney Spears, whose "2011 dancefloor fillers 'Till The World Ends', 'Hold It Against Me' and 'I Wanna Go' all share the same pounding beats that populate modern hyperpop."

Spotify editor Lizzy Szabo referred to A. G. Cook as the "godfather" of hyperpop. According to Enis, PC Music "laid the groundwork for [the genre's] melodic exuberance and cartoonish production", with some of hyperpop's surrealist qualities also derived from 2010s hip hop. She states that hyperpop built on the influence of PC Music, but also incorporated the sounds of emo rap, cloud rap, trap, trance, dubstep and chiptune. Among Cook's frequent collaborators, Variety and The New York Times described the work of Sophie as pioneering the style, while Charli XCX was described as "queen" of the style by Vice, and her 2017 mixtape Pop 2 set a template for its sound, featuring "outré" production by Cook, Sophie, Umru, and Easyfun as well as  "a titular mission to give pop – sonically, spiritually, aesthetically – a facelift for the modern age."

Other artists associated with the term included 100 Gecs, whose debut album 1000 Gecs (2019) amassed millions of listens on streaming services and helped to consolidate the style. In Pritchard's description, 100 Gecs took hyperpop "to its most extreme, and extremely catchy, conclusions: stadium-sized trap beats processed and distorted to near-destruction, overwrought emo vocals and cascades of ravey arpeggios."

Popularity
In August 2019, Spotify launched the "Hyperpop" playlist which further cemented the genre, and featured guest curation from 100 Gecs and others. Other artists featured on the playlist included Cook, Slayyyter, Gupi, Caroline Polachek, Hannah Diamond, and Kim Petras. Spotify editor Lizzy Szabo and her colleagues landed on the name for their August 2019 playlist after McDonald noted the term in the website's metadata and classified it as a microgenre. In November, Cook added artists such as J Dilla and Kate Bush to the playlist, which added confusion to the genre's scope.

According to Vice, a second wave of the genre emerged in 2019 post-100 Gecs. The influence of cloud rap, emo and Dylan Brady's production style distinguishes the second wave of hyperpop.

The genre began to see rise in popularity in 2020, with the prominence of the Spotify playlist and its spread within younger audiences on social media, such as on TikTok. Hyperpop albums like Charli XCX's How I'm Feeling Now (2020) and A. G. Cook's Apple (2020) appeared on critic's 2020 end-of-year lists. Internationally, hyperpop gained notoriety in Australia, China and Hispanic countries, such as Argentina, Chile, Mexico and Spain, with Spanish-speaking artists and producers delving into the microgenre. Nylons Ben Jolley cited  as one of the "biggest names in the scene."

In mid-late 2020, the social media platform TikTok saw a rise in the popularity of hyperpop songs, mainly being used on the 'Alt' side of TikTok, also called 'Alt TikTok'. As of March 2022, videos with the hashtag "hyperpop" have accumulated nearly 400 million views on TikTok. Part of the reason the genre is rising in popularity across the platform can be contributed to the platform's nature of favoring heavy beats that creators can dance to and make transitions. Creators have used hyperpop sounds in their videos, furthering the genre's rise across the platform in reaching millions of users.

While the first wave of hyperpop was a satire and homage to the genre of pop music, the second wave was a replication and homage to the artists included on Spotify's hyperpop playlist, which divided the community.

Related genres

Digicore

“Digicore” is a similar genre to hyperpop. The term (“digi” is short for “digital”) was adopted in the mid-2010s by an online community of teenage musicians, communicating through Discord, to distinguish themselves from the preexisting hyperpop scene. It differs from hyperpop mainly through the racial identities of its artists but there remains a degree of crossover between the scenes. Artists often pull from a variety of genres such as midwestern emo, trance, and Chicago drill, amongst others. The beginnings of digicore are rooted in internet culture and many popular producers from the genre are between the ages of 15 and 18 who use platforms such as Discord to interact. In 2018, Dalton (a digicore artist relations figure) started a Minecraft and Discord server called "Loser's Club" that became a haven for several of the most popular artists within the digicore scene such as Quinn, Glaive, Funeral, Midwxst, and Angelus. This sense of community and collaboration have become key tenets within the scene, and have contributed to the rise in the popularity of the genre as a whole, with a majority of the scene preferring the idea of rising in popularity as a collective rather than as individuals. In 2021, the digicore album Frailty by dltzk (now known as Jane Remover) received praise on mainstream music sites Pitchfork and Paste.

Glitchcore
Glitchcore, a related genre to hyperpop and digicore, is often characterized by high-pitched vocals, sharp 808s, and frequent hi-hats. As one article stated, “Glitchcore is Hyperpop on steroids”, referring to the exaggerated vocals, distortions, glitch noises, and other pop elements present within Glitchcore.

Stef, a producer of the popular Hyperpop and glitchcore collective ‘Helix Tears’ stated that there certainly is a difference between the two genres, saying “Hyperpop is more melodic and poppy” while “Glitchcore is indescribable”. Similar to digicore, glitchcore is typically made up of a younger group of artists than traditional Hyperpop.

TikTok played a key role in popularizing glitchcore, through video edits to two viral glitchcore songs “NEVER MET!” by CMTEN and Glitch Gum and “Pressure” by David Shawty and Yungster Jack. Glitchcore has also been associated with a specific visual aesthetic where videos are typically accompanied by glitchy, fast-paced, cluttered, colorful edits that are even marked with flash warnings in certain cases. Some popular digicore artists like d0llywood1 even refer to glitchcore as “an aesthetic, like the edits”, rather than an actual music genre.

See also
 Avant-pop
 Post-Internet
 Maximalism
 Postmodern music

References

 
Microgenres
21st-century music genres
Nostalgia
2010s in music
2020s in music
Avant-garde music
LGBT-related music
British styles of music